The LGBT community also known as the LGBTQ+ community, GLBT community, gay community, or queer community is a loosely defined grouping of lesbian, gay, bisexual, and transgender individuals united by a common culture and social movements. These communities generally celebrate pride, diversity, individuality, and sexuality. LGBT activists and sociologists see LGBT community-building as a counterweight to heterosexism, homophobia, biphobia, transphobia, sexualism, and conformist pressures that exist in the larger society. The term pride or sometimes gay pride expresses the LGBT community's identity and collective strength; pride parades provide both a prime example of the use and a demonstration of the general meaning of the term. The LGBT community is diverse in political affiliation. Not all people who are lesbian, gay, bisexual, or transgender consider themselves part of the LGBT community.

Groups that may be considered part of the LGBT community include gay villages, LGBT rights organizations, LGBT employee groups at companies, LGBT student groups in schools and universities, and LGBT-affirming religious groups. 

LGBT communities may organize themselves into, or support, movements for civil rights promoting LGBT rights in various places around the world. At the same time, high-profile celebrities in the broader society may offer strong support to these organizations in certain locations; for example, LGBT advocate and entertainer Madonna stated, "I was asked to perform at many Pride events around the world — but I would never, ever turn down New York City."

Terminology

LGBT, or GLBT, is an initialism that stands for lesbian, gay, bisexual, and transgender. In use since the 1990s, the term is an adaptation of the initialism LGB, which was used to replace the term gay - when referring to the community as a whole - beginning in various forms largely in the early 1990s.  

While the movement had always included all LGBT people, the one-word unifying term in the 1950s through the early 1980s was gay (see Gay liberation). Throughout the 1970's and '80s, a number of groups with lesbian members, and pro-feminist politics, preferred the more representative, lesbian and gay. By the early nineties, as more groups shifted to names based on lesbian, gay, bisexual, and transgender (LGBT), queer was also increasingly reclaimed as a one-word alternative to the ever-lengthening string of initials, especially when used by radical political groups, some of which had been using "queer" since the '80s. 

The initialism, as well as common variants such as LGBTQ, have been adopted into the mainstream in the 1990s as an umbrella term for use when labeling topics about sexuality and gender identity. For example, the LGBT Movement Advancement Project termed community centers, which have services specific to those members of the LGBT community, as "LGBT community centers" in comprehensive studies of such centers around the United States.

The initialism LGBT is intended to emphasize a diversity of sexuality and gender identity-based cultures. It may refer to anyone who is non-heterosexual or non-cisgender, instead of exclusively to people who are lesbian, gay, bisexual, or transgender. Recognize this inclusion as a popular variant that adds the letter Q for those who identify as queer or are questioning their sexual identity; LGBTQ has been recorded since 1996.

Symbols

The gay community is frequently associated with certain symbols, especially the rainbow or rainbow flags. The Greek lambda symbol ("L" for liberation), triangles, ribbons, and gender symbols are also used as "gay acceptance" symbol. There are many types of flags to represent subdivisions in the gay community, but the most commonly recognized one is the rainbow flag. According to Gilbert Baker, creator of the commonly known rainbow flag, each color represents a value in the community:
 pink = sexuality
 red = life
 orange = healing
 yellow = the sun
 green = nature
 blue = art
 indigo = harmony
 violet = spirit

Later, pink and indigo were removed from the flag, resulting in the present-day flag which was first presented at the 1979 Pride Parade. Other flags include the Victory over AIDS flag, the Leather Pride flag, and the Bear Pride flag.

The lambda symbol was originally adopted by Gay Activists Alliance of New York in 1970 after they broke away from the larger Gay Liberation Front. Lambda was chosen because people might confuse it for a college symbol and not recognize it as a gay community symbol unless one was actually involved in the community. "Back in December of 1974, the lambda was officially declared the international symbol for gay and lesbian rights by the International Gay Rights Congress in Edinburgh, Scotland."

The triangle became a symbol for the gay community after the Holocaust. Not only did it represent Jews, but homosexuals who were killed because of German law. During the Holocaust, homosexuals were labeled with pink triangles to distinguish between them, Jews, regular prisoners, and political prisoners. The black triangle is similarly a symbol for females only to represent lesbian sisterhood.

The pink and yellow triangle was used to label Jewish homosexuals. Gender symbols have a much longer list of variations of homosexual or bisexual relationships which are clearly recognizable but may not be as popularly seen as the other symbols. Other symbols that relate to the gay community or gay pride include the gay-teen suicide awareness ribbon, AIDS awareness ribbon, labrys, and purple rhinoceros.

In the fall of 1995, the Human Rights Campaign adopted a logo (yellow equal sign on deep blue square) that has become one of the most recognizable symbols of the lesbian, gay, bisexual and transgender community. The logo can be spotted the world over and has become synonymous with the fight for equal rights for LGBT people.

One of the most notable recent changes was made in Philadelphia, Pennsylvania, on June 8, 2017. They added two new stripes to the rainbow flag, one black and one brown. These were intended to highlight members of color within the LGBT community.

Human and legal rights

The LGBT community represented by a social component of the global community that is believed by many, including heterosexual allies, to be underrepresented in the area of civil rights. The current struggle of the gay community has been largely brought about by globalization. In the United States, World War II brought together many closeted rural men from around the nation and exposed them to more progressive attitudes in parts of Europe. Upon returning home after the war, many of these men decided to band together in cities rather than return to their small towns. Fledgling communities would soon become political in the beginning of the gay rights movement, including monumental incidents at places like Stonewall. Today, many large cities have gay and lesbian community centers. Many universities and colleges across the world have support centers for LGBT students. The Human Rights Campaign, Lambda Legal, the Empowering Spirits Foundation, and GLAAD advocate for LGBT people on a wide range of issues in the United States. There is also an International Lesbian and Gay Association. In 1947, when the United Kingdom adopted the Universal Declaration of Human Rights (UDHR), LGBT activists clung to its concept of equal, inalienable rights for all people, regardless of their race, gender, or sexual orientation. The declaration does not specifically mention gay rights, but discusses equality and freedom from discrimination. In 1962, Clark Polak joined The Janus Society in Philadelphia, Pennsylvania. Only a year after, he became president.  In 1968, he announced that the Society would be changing their name to Homosexual Law Reform Society; “Homosexuals are now willing to fly under their own colors” (Stewart, 1968).

Same-sex marriage

In some parts of the world, partnership rights or marriage have been extended to same-sex couples. Advocates of same-sex marriage cite a range of benefits that are denied to people who cannot marry, including immigration, health care, inheritance and property rights, and other family obligations and protections, as reasons why marriage should be extended to same-sex couples. Opponents of same-sex marriage within the gay community argue that fighting to achieve these benefits by means of extending marriage rights to same-sex couples privatizes benefits (e.g., health care) that should be made available to people regardless of their relationship status. They further argue that the same-sex marriage movement within the gay community discriminates against families that are composed of three or more intimate partners. Opposition to the same-sex marriage movement from within the gay community should not be confused with opposition from outside that community.

Media
The contemporary lesbian and gay community has a growing and complex place in the American and Western European media. Lesbians and gay men are often portrayed inaccurately in television, films, and other media. The gay community is often portrayed as many stereotypes, such as gay men being portrayed as flamboyant and bold. Like other minority groups, these caricatures are intended to ridicule this marginalized group.

There is currently a widespread ban of references in child-related entertainment, and when references do occur, they almost invariably generate controversy. In 1997, when American comedian Ellen DeGeneres came out of the closet on her popular sitcom, many sponsors, such as the Wendy's fast food chain, pulled their advertising. Also, a portion of the media has attempted to make the gay community included and publicly accepted with television shows such as Will & Grace or Queer Eye for the Straight Guy. This increased publicity reflects the Coming out movement of the LGBT community. As more celebrities came out, more shows developed, such as the 2004 show The L Word. These depictions of the LGBT community have been controversial, but beneficial for the community. The increase in visibility of LGBT people allowed for the LGBT community to unite to organize and demand change, and it has also inspired many LGBT people to come out.

In the United States, gay people are frequently used as a symbol of social decadence by celebrity evangelists and by organizations such as Focus on the Family. Many LGBT organizations exist to represent and defend the gay community. For example, the Gay and Lesbian Alliance Against Defamation in the United States and Stonewall in the UK work with the media to help portray fair and accurate images of the gay community.

As companies are advertising more and more to the gay community, LGBT activists are using ad slogans to promote gay community views. Subaru marketed its Forester and Outback with the slogan "It's Not a Choice. It's the Way We're Built", which was later used in eight U.S. cities on streets or in gay rights events.

Social media 
Social media is often used as a platform for the LGBT community to congregate and share resources. Search engines and social networking sites provide numerous opportunities for LGBT people to connect with one another; additionally, they play a key role in identity creation and self-presentation. Social networking sites allow for community building as well as anonymity, allowing people to engage as much or as little as they would like. The variety of social media platforms, including Facebook, TikTok, Tumblr, Twitter, and YouTube, have differing associated audiences, affordances and norms. These varying platforms allow for more inclusivity as members of the LGBT community have the agency to decide where to engage and how to self-present themselves. The existence of the LGBT community and discourse on social media platforms is essential to disrupt the reproduction of hegemonic cis-heteronormativity and represent the wide variety of identities that exist.

Before its ban on adult content in 2018, Tumblr was a platform uniquely suited for sharing trans stories and building community. Mainstream social media platforms like TikTok have also been beneficial for the trans community by creating spaces for folks to share resources and transition stories, normalizing trans identity. It has been found that access to LGBT content, peers, and community on search engines and social networking sites has allowed for identity acceptance and pride within LGBT individuals.

Algorithms and evaluative criteria control what content is recommended to users on search engines and social networking site. These can reproduce stigmatizing discourses that are dominant within society, and result in negatively impacting LGBT self-perception. Social media algorithms have a significant impact on the formation of the LGBT community and culture. Algorithmic exclusion occurs when exclusionary practices are reinforced by algorithms across technological landscapes, directly resulting in excluding marginalized identities. The exclusion of these identity representations causes identity insecurity for LGBT people, while further perpetuating cis-heteronormative identity discourse. LGBT users and allies have found methods of subverting algorithms that may suppress content in order to continue to build these online communities.

Buying power

According to Witeck-Combs Communications, Inc. and Marketresearch.com, the 2006 buying power of United States gays and lesbians was approximately $660 billion and was then expected to exceed $835 billion by 2011. Gay consumers can be very loyal to specific brands, wishing to support companies that support the gay community and also provide equal rights for LGBT workers. In the UK, this buying power is sometimes abbreviated to "the pink pound."

According to an article by James Hipps, LGBT Americans are more likely to seek out companies that advertise to them and are willing to pay higher prices for premium products and services. This can be attributed to the median household income compared to same-sex couples to opposite-sex couples. "...studies show that GLBT Americans are twice as likely to have graduated from college, twice as likely to have an individual income over $60,000 and twice as likely to have a household income of $250,000 or more."

Consumerism

Although many claims that the LGBT community is more affluent when compared to heterosexual consumers, research has proven that false. However, the LGBT community is still an important segment of consumer demographics because of the spending power and loyalty to brands that they have. Witeck-Combs Communications calculated the adult LGBT buying power at $830 billion for 2013. Same-sex partnered households spend slightly more than the average home on any given shopping trip. But, they also make more shopping trips compared to the non-LGBT households. On average, the difference in spending with same-sex partnered home is 25 percent higher than the average United States household. According to the University of Maryland gay male partners earn $10,000 less on average compared to heterosexual men. However, partnered lesbians receive about $7,000 more a year than heterosexual married women. Hence, same-sex partners and heterosexual partners are about equal concerning consumer affluence.

The LGBT community has been recognized for being one of the largest consumers in travel. Travel includes annual trips, and sometimes even multiple annual trips. Annually, the LGBT community spends around $65 billion on travel, totaling 10 percent of the United States travel market. Many common travel factors play into LGBT travel decisions, but if there is a destination that is especially tailored to the LGBT community, then they are more likely to travel to those places.

Demographics

In a survey conducted in 2012, younger Americans are more likely to identify as gay. Statistics continue to decrease with age, as adults between ages 18–29 are three times more likely to identify as LGBT than seniors older than 65. These statistics for the LGBT community are taken into account just as they are with other demographics to find trend patterns for specific products. Consumers who identify as LGBT are more likely to regularly engage in various activities as opposed to those who identify as heterosexual. According to Community Marketing, Inc., 90 percent of lesbians and 88 percent of gay men will dine out with friends regularly. And similarly, 31 percent of lesbians and 50 percent of gay men will visit a club or a bar.

And at home, the likelihood of LGBT women having children at home as non-LGBT women is equal. However, LGBT men are half as likely when compared with non-LGBT men to have children at home. Household incomes for sixteen percent of LGBT Americans range above $90,000 per year, in comparison with 21 percent of the overall adult population. However, a key difference is that those who identify as LGBT have fewer children collectively in comparison to heterosexual partners. Another factor at hand is that LGBT populations of color continue to face income barriers along with the rest of the race issues, so they will expectedly earn less and not be as affluent as predicted.

An analysis of a Gallup survey shows detailed estimates that – during the years 2012 through 2014 – the metropolitan area with the highest percentage of LGBT community was San Francisco, California. The next highest were Portland, Oregon, and Austin, Texas.

A 2019 survey of the Two-Spirit and LGBTQ+ population in the Canadian city of Hamilton, Ontario, called Mapping the Void: Two-Spirit and LGBTQ+ Experiences in Hamilton showed that out of 906 respondents, when it came to sexual orientation, 48.9% identified as bisexual/pansexual, 21.6% identified as gay, 18.3% identified as lesbian, 4.9% identified as queer, and 6.3% identified as other (a category consisting of those who indicated they were asexual, heterosexual, or questioning, and those who gave no response for their sexual orientation).

A 2019 survey of trans and non-binary people in Canada called Trans PULSE Canada showed that out of 2,873 respondents. When it came to sexual orientation, 13% identified as asexual, 28% identified as bisexual, 13% identified as gay, 15% identified as lesbian, 31% identified as pansexual, 8% identified as straight or heterosexual, 4% identified as two-spirit, and 9% identified as unsure or questioning.

In a survey carried out in 2021, Gallup found that 7.1% of U.S. adults identify as "lesbian, gay, bisexual, transgender, or something other than straight or heterosexual".

Marketing

Marketing towards the LGBT community was not always a strategy among advertisers. For the last three to four decades, Corporate America has created a market niche for the LGBT community. Three distinct phases define the marketing turnover: 1) shunning in the 1980s, 2) curiosity and fear in the 1990s, and 3) pursuit in the 2000s.

Just recently, marketers have picked up the LGBT demographic. With a spike in same-sex marriage in 2014, marketers are figuring out new ways to tie in a person's sexual orientation to a product being sold. In efforts to attract members of the LGBT community to their products, market researchers are developing marketing methods that reach these new families. Advertising history has shown that when marketing to the family, it was always the wife, the husband, and the children. But today, that is not necessarily the case. There could be families of two fathers or two mothers with one child or six children. Breaking away from the traditional family setting, marketing researchers notice the need to recognize these different family configurations.

One area that marketers are subject to fall under is stereotyping the LGBT community. When marketing towards the community, they may corner their target audience into an "alternative" lifestyle category that ultimately "others" the LGBT community. Sensitivity is of importance when marketing towards the community. When marketing towards the LGBT community, advertisers respect the same boundaries.

Marketers also refer to LGBT as a single characteristic that makes an individual. Other areas can be targeted along with the LGBT segment such as race, age, culture, and income levels. Knowing the consumer gives these marketers power.

Along with attempts to engage with the LGBT community, researchers have found gender disagreements among products with respective consumers. For instance, a gay male may want a more feminine product, whereas a lesbian female may be interested in a more masculine product. This does not hold for the entire LGBT community, but the possibilities of these differences are far greater. In the past, gender was seen as fixed, and a congruent representation of an individual's sex. It is understood now that sex and gender are fluid separately. Researchers also noted that when evaluating products, a person's biological sex is as equal is a determinant as their  self-concept. As a customer response, when the advertisement is directed towards them, gay men and women are more likely to have an interest in the product. This is an important factor and goal for marketers because it indicates future loyalty to the product or brand.

Health

Discrimination and mental health

In a 2001 study that examined possible root causes of mental disorders in lesbian, gay and bisexual people, Cochran and psychologist Vickie M. Mays, of the University of California, explored whether ongoing discrimination fuels anxiety, depression and other stress-related mental health problems among LGB people. The authors found strong evidence of a relationship between the two. The team compared how 74 LGB and 2,844 heterosexual respondents rated lifetime and daily experiences with discrimination such as not being hired for a job or being denied a bank loan, as well as feelings of perceived discrimination. LGB respondents reported higher rates of perceived discrimination than heterosexuals in every category related to discrimination, the team found. However, while gay youth are considered to be at higher risk for suicide, a literature review published in the journal Adolescence states, "Being gay in-and-of-itself is not the cause of the increase in suicide." Rather the review notes that the findings of previous studies suggested the,"...suicide attempts were significantly associated with psychosocial stressors, including gender nonconformity, early awareness of being gay, victimization, lack of support, school dropout, family problems, acquaintances' suicide attempts, homelessness, substance abuse, and other psychiatric disorders. Some of these stressors are also experienced by heterosexual adolescents, but they have been shown to be more prevalent among gay adolescents." Despite recent progress in LGBT rights, gay men continue to experience high rates of loneliness and depression after coming out.

LGBT multiculturalism

General
LGBT multiculturalism is the diversity within the LGBT (lesbian, gay, bisexual, transgender) community as a representation of different sexual orientations, gender identities—as well as different ethnic, language, religious groups within the LGBT community. At the same time as LGBT and multiculturalism relation, may consider the inclusion of LGBT community into a larger multicultural model, as for example in universities, such multicultural model includes the LGBT community together and equal representation with other large minority groups such as African Americans in the United States.

The two movements have much in common politically. Both are concerned with tolerance for real differences, diversity, minority status, and the invalidity of value judgments applied to different ways of life.

Researchers have identified the emergence of gay and lesbian communities during several progressive time periods across the world including: the Renaissance, Enlightenment, and modern Westernization. Depending on geographic location, some of these communities experienced more opposition to their existence than others; nonetheless, they began to permeate society both socially and politically.

European cities past and present
City spaces in Early Modern Europe were host to a wealth of gay activity; however, these scenes remained semi-secretive for a long period of time. Dating back to the 1500s, city conditions such as apprenticeship labor relations and living arrangements, abundant student and artist activity, and hegemonic norms surrounding female societal status were typical in Venice and Florence, Italy. Under these circumstances, many open minded young people were attracted to these city settings. Consequently, an abundance of same-sex interactions began to take place. Many of the connections formed then often led to the occurrence of casual romantic and sexual relationships, the prevalence of which increased quite rapidly over time until a point at which they became a subculture and community of their own.
Literature and ballroom culture gradually made their way onto the scene and became integrated despite transgressive societal views. Perhaps the most well-known of these are the balls of Magic-City. Amsterdam and London have also been recognized as leading locations for LGBT community establishment. By the 1950s, these urban spaces were booming with gay venues such as bars and public saunas where community members could come together. Paris and London were particularly attracting to the lesbian population as platforms for not only socialization, but education as well. A few other urban occasions that are important to the LGBT community include Carnival in Rio de Janeiro, Brazil, Mardi Gras in Sydney, Australia, as well as the various other pride parades hosted in bigger cities around the world.

Urban spaces in the United States
In the same way in which LGBT people used the city backdrop to join together socially, they were able to join forces politically as well. This new sense of collectivity provided somewhat of a safety net for individuals when voicing their demands for equal rights. In the United States specifically, several key political events have taken place in urban contexts. Some of these include, but are not limited to:

 Independence Hall, Philadelphia - gay and lesbian protest movement in 1965 – activists led by Barbara Gittings started some of the first picket lines here. These protests continued on and off until 1969. Gittings went on to run the Gay and Lesbian Task Force of the American Library Association for 15 years.

 The Stonewall Inn, on Christopher Street in Greenwich Village,  Manhattan – the birthplace of the modern gay rights movement in 1969 – for the first time, a group of gay men and drag queens fought back against police during a raid on this small bar in Greenwich Village. The site is now a U.S. National Historic Landmark.

 Castro Street, San Francisco – a gathering place for LGBT folks beginning in the 1970s; this urban spot was an oasis of hopefulness. Home to the first openly gay elected official Harvey Milk and the legendary Castro Theater, this cityscape remains iconic to the LGBT community.

 Cambridge, Massachusetts City Hall – the site of the first same-sex marriage in U.S. history in 2004. Following this event, attempts by religious groups in the area to ban it have been stifled and many more states have joined the Commonwealth.

 AIDS Activities Coordinating Office, Philadelphia – an office to help stop the spread of HIV/AIDS, by providing proper administrative components, direct assistance, and education on HIV/AIDS.

During and following these events, LGBT community subculture began to grow and stabilize into a nationwide phenomenon. Gay bars became more and more popular in large cities. For gays particularly, increasing numbers of cruising areas, public bath houses, and YMCAs in these urban spaces continued to welcome them to experience a more liberated way of living. For lesbians, this led to the formation of literary societies, private social clubs, and same-sex housing. The core of this community-building took place in New York City and San Francisco, but cities like St. Louis, Lafayette Park in WA, and Chicago quickly followed suit.

City
Cities afford a host of prime conditions that allow for better individual development as well as collective movement that are not otherwise available in rural spaces. First and foremost, urban landscapes offer LGBTs better prospects to meet other LGBTs and form networks and relationships. One ideal platform within this framework was the free labor market of many capitalistic societies which enticed people to break away from their often damaging traditional nuclear families in order to pursue employment in bigger cities. Making the move to these spaces afforded them new liberty in the realms of sexuality, identity, and also kinship. Some researchers describe this as a phase of resistance against the confining expectations of normativity. Urban LGBTs demonstrated this push back through various outlets including their style of dress, the way they talked and carried themselves, and how they chose to build community. From a social science perspective, the relationship between the city and LGBT community is not a one-way street. LGBTs give back as much, if not more, in terms of economic contributions (i.e. "pink money"), activism and politics too.

Intersections of race 

Compared to white LGBT individuals, LGBT people of color often experience prejudice, stereotyping, and discrimination on the basis of not only their sexual orientation and gender identity, but also on the basis of race. Nadal and colleagues discuss LGBTQ people of color and their experience of intersectional microaggressions which target various aspects of their social identities. These negative experiences and microaggressions can come from cisgender and heterosexual white individuals, cisgender and heterosexual individuals of their own race, and from the LGBT community themselves, which is usually dominated by white people.

Some LGBT people of color do not feel comfortable and represented within LGBT spaces. A comprehensive and systematic review of the existing published research literature around the experiences of LGBT individuals of color finds a common theme of exclusion in largely white LGBT spaces. These spaces are typically dominated by white LGBT individuals, promote White and Western values, and often leave LGBT individuals of color feeling as though they must choose between their racial community or their gender and sexual orientation community. In general, Western society will often subtly code “gay” as white; white LGBT folks are often seen as the face of LGBT culture and values.

The topic of coming out and revealing one’s sexual orientation and gender identity to the public is associated with white values and expectations in mainstream discussions. Where white Western culture places value on the ability to speak openly about one’s identity with family, one particular study found that LGBT participants of color viewed their family's silence about their identity as supportive and accepting. For example, collectivist cultures view the coming out process as a family affair rather than an individual one. Furthermore, the annual National Coming Out Day centers white perspectives as an event meant to help an LGBT person feel liberated and comfortable in their own skin. However, for some LGBT people of color, National Coming Out Day is viewed in a negative light. In communities of color, coming out publicly can have adverse consequences, risking their personal sense of safety as well as that of their familial and communal relationships. White LGBT people tend to collectively reject these differences in perspective on coming out resulting in possibly further isolating their LGBT siblings of Color.

See also

 Bisexual community
 Gay friendly
 Gay male culture
 Homosocialization
 Lesbian
 LGBT culture
 LGBT history
 LGBT symbols
 List of gay villages
 Sexuality and gender identity-based cultures
 Transgender
 Taimi LGBTQI+ community
 Queercore

References

Further reading
 Murphy, Timothy F., Reader's Guide to Lesbian and Gay Studies, 2000. (African American LGBT community, and also its relation to art.) Partial view at Google Books

LGBT culture
LGBT and society
Types of communities